Echinosepala aspasicensis is a species of orchid plant native to Venezuela.

References 

aspasicensis
Flora of Venezuela
Plants described in 1855